On 28 March 2019, the FR Tower Fire broke out on the eighth floor of the 22-storey FR Tower in the commercial Banani area of Dhaka, Bangladesh around 1:00 pm BST. It caused 25 deaths and more than 70 others were injured. Duronto TV and Radio Today shut down their transmissions when the fire broke out because both of their offices were situated beside the FR tower.

Casualties
As of 28 March, the death toll was estimated to be at least 26. Among the dead was a Sri Lankan citizen who fell to his death while escaping the fire. In addition, at least 70 people were injured and transported to hospitals with severe burns and lung damage.

See also
 February 2019 Dhaka fire

References

2019 disasters in Bangladesh
2019 fires in Asia
2010s in Dhaka
Building and structure fires in Asia
Fires in Dhaka
March 2019 events in Bangladesh
Commercial building fires